Toral Rasputra (born 9 September 1987) is an Indian television actress. Rasputra has appeared in many well known successful shows, but is best recognized for starring as Anandi from 2013 to 2016 in Colors TV's Balika Vadhu, one of the longest-running Hindi television shows. She was last seen in Colors TV's Molkki, produced by Ekta Kapoor.

Television

Plays

References 

Living people
21st-century Indian actresses
Marathi people
Indian soap opera actresses
Indian television actresses
Actresses from Mumbai
1987 births